Gian Vincenzo Micheli (died 1596) was a Roman Catholic prelate who served as Bishop of Minervino Murge (1545–1596) and Bishop of Lavello (1539–1545).

Biography
On 30 May 1539, Gian Vincenzo Micheli was appointed during the papacy of Pope Paul III as Bishop of Lavello.
On 2 March 1545, he was appointed during the papacy of Pope Paul III as Bishop of Minervino Murge.
He served as Bishop of Minervino Murge until his death in 1596.

References

External links and additional sources
 (Chronology of Bishops) 
 (Chronology of Bishops) 
 (for Chronology of Bishops) 
 (for Chronology of Bishops) 

16th-century Italian Roman Catholic bishops
Bishops appointed by Pope Paul III
1596 deaths